Borken (Westf) station is the main station of the town of Borken and important transport hub of west Münsterland in the German state of North Rhine-Westphalia.

Borken station is a former railway junction on the Gelsenkirchen-Bismarck–Winterswijk railway, the Empel-Rees–Münster railway and the Borken–Steinfurt railway. Since 1996, it has been the terminus of the only section of the Gelsenkirchen-Bismarck–Winterswijk line that is still operating.

History

The Dutch Westphalian Railway (NWE) began to build its Gelsenkirchen-Bismarck–Winterswijk line in 1878. It opened it together with the line from Borken-Gemen station as a through station on 21 June 1880. It was named Borken (Westphalia) station on 6 March 1883.

The Prussian state railways (PSE) took over the line of the NWE in 1889. On 1 August 1902, it opened the Empel-Rees–Münster railway from Bocholt station, making Borken station into a railway junction. Just two months later, on 1 October 1902, the Westfälische Landes-Eisenbahn (Westphalian Lands Railway, WLE) opened its terminus of the Borken–Steinfurt line nearby. On 1 October 1904, the PSE opened the Borken-Coesfeld section of the Empel-Rees–Münster line.

Operations

Borken station is now served only by a single Regional-Express service. This is like a Stadt-Express service, as it stops on the section south of Gladbeck West only at the most important stations, while each station is served on the northern section:

Bus services

Notes

External links

Railway stations in North Rhine-Westphalia
Railway stations in Germany opened in 1880